Papilio arcturus, the blue peacock, is a species of swallowtail butterfly found in the Indian subcontinent.

Description

Male has the upper wings brownish black, somewhat paler on the forewing than on the hindwing. Forewing irrorated (sprinkled) with brilliant golden-green scales that on the posterior half of the wing form a broad, not well-defined subterminal band; the veins and elongate streaks between them on the outer half of the wing velvety black. Hindwing has the posterior three-fourths irrorated with brilliant golden-green scales as on the forewing but towards the base anteriorly these are blue; a conspicuous brilliant blue patch somewhat irregular in shape occupies the apex of the cell and the bases of interspaces 5 and 6, prolonged as a broad streak in the latter interspace up to the terminal margin; below this a more or less triangular patch on the disc and above it the whole of the costal margin broadly are devoid of the irroration of green scales; a subterminal generally incomplete series of large claret-red lunules terminates at the tornal angle in a large conspicuous black-centred red ocellus; the latter is encircled above and anteriorly by a narrow band formed by a conflux of the green irrorated scales; the lunules are bordered outwardly by spots of the ground colour that are devoid of the green scales; finally both the lunules and the tornal ocellus are tinged more or less with bluish purple on their inner margins, underside dull black, with a somewhat sparse irroration of yellowish-white scales confined on the forewing to the base and apex, and on the hindwing to the posterior two-thirds, not extended to the termen except along the tail. Forewing: a broad ill-defined subterminal pale transverse area, crossed by the black veins and internervular streaks, and elongated pale cellular streaks. Hindwing: a large somewhat quadrate terminal black-centred claret-red patch in interspaces 1 and 2, and a subterminal series of broad claret-red lunules that extends from interspaces 3 to 7, followed by ill-defined anteciliary red spots in each interspace. Cilia of both forewings and hindwings white, alternated with black. Antennae, head, thorax and abdomen brownish black; the head, thorax and abdomen at base on the upperside sprinkled with golden-green scales.

The female is similar to the male but the markings are more prominent. Upperside of forewing has the subterminal golden-green band broader and on the hindwing the subterminal series of claret-red lunules more complete than in the male.

References

Other sources
Erich Bauer and Thomas Frankenbach, 1998 Schmetterlinge der Erde, Butterflies of the world Part I (1), Papilionidae Papilionidae I: Papilio, Subgenus Achillides, Bhutanitis, Teinopalpus. Edited by Erich Bauer and Thomas Frankenbach.  Keltern: Goecke & Evers; Canterbury: Hillside Books 

arcturus
Insects of Pakistan
Butterflies of Indochina
Butterflies described in 1842